Abdelkader Ferhaoui, known as Kader Ferhaoui (born March 19, 1965) is an Algerian former professional footballer who played as a midfielder.

Managerial career
On September 16, 2010, Ferhaoui was appointed as interim head coach of Ligue 1 side AC Arles-Avignon.

Personal life
Ferhaoui is the father of the French footballer Ryan Ferhaoui.

Honours
Montpellier
Coupe Gambardella: runner-up 1984
Coupe de France: 1989–90
French Division 2: 1986–87
Coupe d'été: 1992
Intertoto Cup: Runner-up 1997

Saint-Étienne
French Division 2: 1998–99

Algeria
Africa Cup of Nations: third place 1988
Afro-Asian Cup of Nations: 1991

Individual
French Division 2 Footballer of the Year: 1999

References

External links

1965 births
Living people
Association football midfielders
Algerian footballers
Algeria international footballers
Algerian football managers
1988 African Cup of Nations players
Montpellier HSC players
AS Cannes players
AS Saint-Étienne players
Red Star F.C. players
Ligue 1 players
Ligue 2 players
AC Arlésien managers
SC Toulon managers
Footballers from Oran
Algerian expatriate footballers
Algerian expatriate sportspeople in France
Expatriate footballers in France
21st-century Algerian people